The 2012–13 UEFA Champions League was the 58th season of Europe's premier club football tournament organised by UEFA, and the 21st season since it was renamed from the European Champion Clubs' Cup to the UEFA Champions League.

The final was played at Wembley Stadium in London, England, in recognition of the 150th anniversary of the formation of England's Football Association, the world's oldest football association. It came just two years after Wembley hosted the final in 2011, making it the seventh occasion Wembley Stadium (current and old) had hosted the Champions League final. Bayern Munich, who had been runners-up in 2011–12, won by defeating Bundesliga rivals Borussia Dortmund 2–1 via an 89th-minute goal from Arjen Robben. This was Bayern's 10th final, their first European Cup title in 12 years and their fifth overall. This was the first all-German final and the fourth final to feature two teams from the same association, after the finals of 2000, 2003 and 2008.

The defending champions, Chelsea, were eliminated in the group stage, becoming the first title holders to leave the competition at this stage. They went on to win the 2013 UEFA Europa League Final, and became the first team to win the Europa League while holding the Champions League crown.

Association team allocation
A total of 76 teams from 52 of the 53 UEFA member associations participate in the 2012–13 UEFA Champions League (the exception being Liechtenstein, which do not organise a domestic league). The association ranking based on the UEFA country coefficients is used to determine the number of participating teams for each association:
Associations 1–3 each have four teams qualify
Associations 4–6 each have three teams qualify
Associations 7–15 each have two teams qualify
Associations 16–53 (except Liechtenstein) each have one team qualify
Because the winners of the 2011–12 UEFA Champions League, Chelsea, failed to qualify for the 2012–13 UEFA Champions League through their domestic league (finishing sixth in the Premier League), and because of the restriction that no association can have more than four teams playing in the Champions League, Chelsea's entry in the 2012–13 UEFA Champions League as title holders came at the expense of Tottenham Hotspur, the fourth-placed team of the 2011–12 Premier League (who entered the Europa League instead).

Association ranking
For the 2012–13 UEFA Champions League, the associations are allocated places according to their 2011 UEFA country coefficients, which takes into account their performance in European competitions from 2006–07 to 2010–11.

Distribution
Tottenham Hotspur were due to enter the Champions League play-off round for non-champions, but instead entered the Europa League because Chelsea won the Champions League the previous season. As this spot in the play-off round was vacated, the following change to the default allocation system was made to compensate:
The third-placed team of association 6 (Portugal) and the runners-up of association 7 (Russia) were promoted from the third qualifying round to the play-off round

Quarter-finals
The draw for the quarter-finals was held on 15 March 2013. The first legs were played on 2 and 3 April, and the second legs were played on 9 and 10 April 2013.

|}

Semi-finals
The draw for the semi-finals and final (to determine the "home" team for administrative purposes) was held on 12 April 2013. The first legs were played on 23 and 24 April, and the second legs were played on 30 April and 1 May 2013.

|}

Final

The final was played on 25 May 2013 at Wembley Stadium in London, England.

Statistics
Statistics exclude qualifying rounds and play-off round.

Top goalscorers

Top assists

Prize money
For the 2012–13 season, UEFA awarded €2.1 million to each team in the play-off round. For reaching the group stage, UEFA awarded a base fee of €8.6 million. A win in the group was awarded €1 million and a draw was worth €500,000. In addition, UEFA paid teams reaching the first knockout round €3.5 million, each quarter-finalist €3.9 million, €4.9 million for each semi-finalist, €6.5 million for the runners-up and €10.5 million for the winners.

Playoffs: €2,100,000
Base fee for group stage: €8,600,000
Group match victory: €1,000,000
Group match draw: €500,000
Round of 16: €3,500,000
Quarter-finals: €3,900,000
Semi-finals: €4,900,000
Losing finalist: €6,500,000
Winning the Final: €10,500,000

A large part of the distributed revenue from the UEFA Champions League is linked to the "market pool", the distribution of which is determined by the value of the television market in each country. For the 2012–13 season, Juventus, who were eliminated on quarter-finals, earned nearly €65.3 million in total of which €20.5 million was prize money, compared with the €55.0 million earned by Bayern Munich, who won the tournament and was awarded with €35.9 million of prize money.

See also
2012–13 UEFA Europa League
2013 UEFA Super Cup
2013 FIFA Club World Cup
2012–13 UEFA Women's Champions League

References

External links

2012–13 UEFA Champions League UEFA.com
2012–13 UEFA Champions League Technical Report UEFA.com

 
1
2012-13